Tomarus neglectus is a species of rhinoceros beetle in the family Scarabaeidae.

References

Further reading

 

Dynastinae
Articles created by Qbugbot
Beetles described in 1847